The Indo-Australian Plate is a major tectonic plate that includes the continent of Australia and the surrounding ocean and extends northwest to include the Indian subcontinent and the adjacent waters. It was formed by the fusion of the Indian and the Australian plates approximately 43 million years ago. The fusion happened when the mid-ocean ridge in the Indian Ocean, which separated the two plates, ceased spreading.

Regions
India, Australia, New Guinea, Tasmania, New Zealand, and New Caledonia are all fragments of the ancient supercontinent of Gondwana. As the ocean floor broke apart, these land masses fragmented from one another, and for a time these centers were thought to be dormant and fused into a single plate. However, research in the early 21st century indicates plate separation of the Indo-Australian Plate may have already occurred.

Characteristics
The eastern side of the plate is the convergent boundary with the Pacific plate. The Pacific plate sinks below the Australian plate and forms the Kermadec Trench and the island arcs of Tonga and Kermadec. New Zealand is situated along the southeastern boundary of the plate, which with New Caledonia make up the southern and northern ends of the ancient landmass of Zealandia, which separated from Australia 85 million years ago. The central part of Zealandia sank under the sea.

The southern margin of the plate forms a divergent boundary with the Antarctic plate. The western side is subdivided by the Indian plate that borders the Arabian plate to the north and the African plate to the south. The northern margin of the Hindustani plate forms a convergent boundary with the Eurasian plate, which constitutes the active orogenic process of the Himalayas and the Hindukush mountains.

The northeast side of the Australian plate forms a subduction boundary with the Eurasian plate in the Indian Ocean and between the borders of Bangladesh and Burma, and to the southwest of the Indonesian islands of Sumatra and Borneo. The subsidence boundary through Indonesia is reflected in the Wallace line.

Plate movements
This differential movement has resulted in the compression of the former plate near its centre at Sumatra and the division into the Indian and Australian Plates.

A third plate, known as the Capricorn Plate, may also be separating off the western side of the Indian plate as part of the continued breakup of the Indo-Australian Plate.

Separation
Recent studies, and evidence from seismic events such as the 2012 Indian Ocean earthquakes, suggest that the Indo-Australian Plate may have broken up into two or three separate plates due primarily to stresses induced by the collision of the Indo-Australian Plate with Eurasia along what later became the Himalayas, and that the Indian Plate and Australian Plate have been separate since at least .

References

Tectonic plates
Plates
Plates
Plates
Plates
Plates
Plates
Plates